The Red Bull Frozen Rush was an short course off-road match race held on snowy alpine skiing slopes. The event debuted in 2014 featuring eight short-course and desert off-road racing drivers. Road & Track magazine said "The unique action provided a mix between the traditional stadium-style off-road racing and the crossover jumping from Global Rallycross."

History
In 2013, Red Bull had their team driver Ricky Johnson haul one of his Pro 4 short course trucks across the United States from California to Mount Snow in Vermont for an exhibition on the ski slopes. Red Bull filmed the exhibition and the video was popular enough that they decided to turn it into a competition.

The first competition happened in 2014 at the Sunday River Resort near Newry, Maine. The drivers raced the trucks on the resort's snowy ski slopes. About 10000 spectators attended the event with temperatures topping out below .

Vehicles
The event features Pro 4 four-wheel drive Trophy Trucks racing with studded tires. The BFGoodrich race tires featured an inner liner and approximately 700 studs. The studs damaged the fiberglass fenders of some trucks. The 900-horsepower trucks have modified jets in their carburetors for the less dense air in the higher altitude. Teams had to adjust their suspensions and gear ratios for the conditions. Trucks didn't need to use as efficient of cooling systems in the cooler temperatures.

Drivers
In the inaugural 2014 event, eight drivers from the two national series (TORC and LOORRS) were selected to compete head to head with the victory advancing to the next round. Ricky Johnson beat Johnny Greaves in the final round for the win after Greaves received a 5-second penalty for hitting a gate. The 2014 Frozen Rush was broadcast taped delayed on NBC Sports' Red Bull Signature Series program. Drivers use thick gloves and heated helmet technology developed for snowmobile racing.

Competitors

References

External links
 

 
Off-road racing
Red Bull sports events
Auto races in the United States
Motorsport in Maine
Recurring sporting events established in 2014
Annual sporting events in the United States